is a railway station on the Chikuho Main Line operated by JR Kyushu in Kotake, Kurate District, Fukuoka Prefecture, Japan.

Lines

Station layout 
The station, which is unstaffed, consists of an island platform serving two tracks. There is no station building but a shelter is provided on the platform for waiting passengers. A footbridge from the main road gives access to the island platform and also to the other side of the tracks.

Adjacent stations

History 
On 1 October 1897, the Chikuho Kogyo Railway, now renamed the Chikuho Railway, merged with the Kyushu Railway which acquired the track. On 13 February 1901, Katsuno was opened as an additional station on the track for the transport of freight only. After the Kyushu Railway was nationalized on 1 July 1907, Japanese Government Railways (JGR) took over control of the station. On 12 October 1909, the station became part of the Chikuho Main Line. On 21 July 1912, JGR upgraded the station to include passenger services. With the privatization of Japanese National Railways (JNR), the successor of JGR, on 1 April 1987, control of the station passed to JR Kyushu.

References

External links
Katsuno Station (JR Kyushu)

Railway stations in Fukuoka Prefecture
Railway stations in Japan opened in 1912